The Newark Fire Division provides fire protection, hazardous materials services, and first responder emergency medical services to the city of Newark, New Jersey. With a population of 281,764 it is New Jersey's largest city. In all the division is responsible for protecting 26.107 sq mi (67.617 km). Originally separate departments, the Police, Fire, Office of Emergency Management and Homeland Security were consolidated into a Department of Public Safety under Mayor Ras J. Baraka. The Division is part of the Metro USAR Strike Team which is composed of nine north Jersey fire departments working together to address major emergency and rescue situations.

Organization
The Newark Fire Division is the second largest municipal fire department in the state of New Jersey. The division is organized into 14 Divisions: Administration, Community Relations, M.I.S. (Technology), Emergency Management, Fire Prevention and Life Safety, Fire Signal System Operations (Communications), Firefighting, Investigations, Photography and Media Liaison, Special Operations and Hazardous Materials Response, Apparatus, Mask Repair, Special Services, and Training. These are the main divisions within the Newark Fire Division.

The Office of the Public Safety Director, Assistant Public Safety Director, and Chief of Division, the Administration Division, the Emergency Management Division, and Media Liaison Divisions are located at Fire Headquarters, 480 Clinton Ave.

The Community Relations Division, Fire Prevention and Life Safety Division, and Citizen Clergy(chaplains) are located at 1010 18th Avenue.

Office for Fire Investigations/Cause and Origin Division(Arson Squad), Car 52, is located at 360 Clinton Ave.

The Special Operations and Hazardous Materials Response Division, as well as the Training Division is located at 191 Orange St. The Air Cascade Unit, Metro USAR Collapse Rescue Shoring Unit, Haz-Mat Mobile Lab, Haz-Mat Support Unit, Dive Team Unit, and the Mobile Command Unit, as well as spare and reserve apparatus are also located there.

The Marine Division (Fireboats) is on Corbin St. in Port Newark.

The M.I.S. and Communications Division is located at a joint Emergency Dispatch facility with the Newark Police Department, located at 311 Washington St.

The Apparatus Division, as well as the Mask Repair Division, is located at the city of Newark's Motors Division at 233 Wilson Ave.

The Newark Fire Division's Special Services Division, which includes the Fire Alarm Line and Supply Divisions, is located at 56 Prospect St.

The Bell & Siren Club Canteen/Rehab truck, Car 17, is stationed in a firehouse in the nearby city of East Orange and responds to incidents countywide.

Operations
The Newark Fire Division is the second largest fire department in the state of New Jersey, and protects NJ's largest city with a population of 281,764 as of 2016, and a land area of 26.107 square miles. As a part of the Firefighting Division, the Newark Fire Department currently operates 16 Engine Companies, 8 Ladder Companies, and 1 Rescue Company along with various specialized units out of 16 firehouses, located throughout the city. These are organized into 4 firefighting Battalions (Battalions 1,3,4, and 5), which are commanded by one Battalion Chief each shift. There is also a Safety  Battalion (Battalion 2) and a Special Operations Battalion (Battalion 6) which are staffed by one Battalion Chief each shift. There is a Deputy Chief, also known as a Tour Commander, who commands all of the Battalion Chiefs each shift.

The division is part of the Metro USAR Strike Team, which consists of nine northern New Jersey fire departments and other emergency services divisions working to address major emergency rescue situations.

Stations and apparatus 

Below is a list of all fire companies and firehouses in the city of Newark. All Special Operations, Haz-Mat, support, spare and reserve apparatus,  are all housed at 191 Orange St. unless otherwise noted below.

Disbanded Fire Companies
Below is a list of NFD fire companies that have been disbanded due to budget cuts or departmental reorganization:
 Engine 1 - 188 Mulberry St. - Disbanded 1980
 Engine 2 - 39 Centre St. - Disbanded 1974
 Engine 3 - 188 Mulberry St. - Disbanded 1956
 Engine 4 - 241 High St. - Disbanded 1985
 Engine 8 - 296 Ferry St. - Disbanded 1997
 Engine 12 - 360 Clinton Ave. - Disbanded 2010
 Engine 17 - 86 Clinton Pl. - Disbanded 2006
 Engine 20 - 15 Prince St. - Disbanded 1974
 Engine 21 - 420 Sanford Ave. - Disbanded 2006
 Engine 22 - 199 New St. - Disbanded 1956
 Engine 23 - 44 Mt. Prospect Ave. - Disbanded 1957
 Engine 24 - 188 Mulberry St. - Disbanded 1943
 Engine 25 - 395 Avon Ave. - Disbanded 1933
 Engine 30 - 44 Mt. Prospect Ave. - Disbanded 1933
 Engine 31 - 69 Vesey St. - Disbanded 1935
 Engine 32 - 270 Port St. - Disbanded 1983
 Ladder 1 - 191 Orange St. - Disbanded 2010
 Ladder 2 - 241 High St. - Disbanded 1982
 Ladder 3 - 241 W. Market St. - Disbanded 1980
 Ladder 9 - 395 Avon Ave. - Disbanded 2006
 Battalion 4-1 - 395 Avon Ave. - Disbanded 1972
 Deputy 2 - 65 Congress St. - Disbanded 1994
 Deputy 3 - 44 Mt. Prospect Ave. - Disbanded 1974
 Water Tower 1 - 39 Centre St. - Disbanded 1944
 Searchlight 1 - 56 Prospect St. - Disbanded 1969
 Salvage 1 - 65 Congress St. - Disbanded 1972
 Salvage 2 - 213 Belmont Ave. - Disbanded 1972
 Tactical Unit 1 - 15 Prince St. - Disbanded 1980
 Tactical Unit 2 - 241 W. Market St. - Disbanded 1976

References

External links
 Official Website

Fire departments in New Jersey
Government of Newark, New Jersey